Mike Young MBE (born 19 April 1967) is a Leadership Consultant.

Biography 
Dr Mike Young MBE is a consultant and academic specialising in the fields of leadership, change and systems thinking. He studied Environmental Science at the University of Ulster has completed two master's degrees with dissertations in leadership and a Doctor in Business Administration. He was also the 2019/2020 Hudson Fellow at St Antony's College Oxford. A Chartered Fellow of the Chartered Institute of Personnel and Development, and a Fellow of the Institute of Business Consulting, he is also a certified management consultant, coach and supervisor.

A retired Royal Navy Captain Young continues to provide leadership assessment and development expertise to the Senior Service in a part-time capacity.  Previously posts included being Head of Recruiting and prior to that Head of Wellbeing devising the ‘NavyFit’ programme which increased participation in physical activity, morale and retention. Previously, as Dean of the Navy's engineering college, Young introduced an output-focussed strategy management system, and a coaching culture, which underpinned the first ever military OFSTED ‘Outstanding’ award achieved in the UK. He also spent four years as the Royal Navy's Head of Leadership and Management Development, developing the model on which the Navy's leadership selection and training is  based.

Young runs a boutique consultancy 'helping change leaders' and is a research active academic and author of numerous journal articles.

Awards 
Young was awarded an MBE in the Queen's Birthday Honours List 2005, in recognition for his contribution to leadership development in the Royal Navy.

References

Living people
Members of the Order of the British Empire
1967 births